Beach flag football competition at the 2014 Asian Beach Games was held in Phuket, Thailand from 12 to 14 November 2014 at Saphan Hin Sports Center.

Medalists

Results

Preliminaries

Knockout round

Semifinals

Gold medal match

References

External links 
 Official website

2014 Asian Beach Games events
Flag football